The 19307/19308 Indore–Chandigarh Express is an Express train belonging to Indian Railways – Western Railway zone that runs between  &  in India.

It operates as train number 19307 from Indore Junction to Chandigarh Junction and as train number 19308 in the reverse direction, serving the states of Madhya Pradesh, Uttar Pradesh, Haryana, Delhi & the Union territory of Chandigarh.

Coaches

The 19307 / 08 Indore–Chandigarh Express has 1 AC 2 tier, 4 AC 3 tier, 11 Sleeper class, 4 General Unreserved & 2 SLR (Seating cum Luggage Rake) coaches. It does not carry a pantry car.

As is customary with most train services in India, coach composition may be amended at the discretion of Indian Railways depending on demand.

Service

19307 Indore–Chandigarh Express covers the distance of 1119 kilometres in 25 hours 15 mins (45.34 km/hr) & in 22 hours 20 mins as 19308 Chandigarh–Indore Express (50.90 km/hr).

As the average speed of the train is below , as per Indian Railways rules, its fare does not include a Superfast surcharge.

Routing

Schedule

Direction reversal

Train reverses its direction at:

Traction

Despite nearly 58% of the route being electrified, a Ratlam-based WDM-3A hauls the train for its entire journey.

References 

 http://www.wr.indianrailways.gov.in/view_detail.jsp?lang=0&dcd=1808&id=0,4,268
 http://timesofindia.indiatimes.com/city/indore/Thumbs-down-to-Indore-Chandigarh-weekly-train/articleshow/29830698.cms
 http://timesofindia.indiatimes.com/city/chandigarh/Indore-City-Express-to-run-from-February-7/articleshow/29626430.cms
 http://timesofindia.indiatimes.com/city/indore/Mixed-response-to-Indore-Chandigarh-Express/articleshow/30219485.cms
 http://timesofindia.indiatimes.com/city/chandigarh/9-new-trains-gear-up-to-chug-off/articleshow/20838804.cms
 https://web.archive.org/web/20140209052937/http://www.hindustantimes.com/punjab/chandigarh/chandigarh-indore-to-chug-off-tomorrow/article1-1181270.aspx

External links

Transport in Indore
Express trains in India
Rail transport in Madhya Pradesh
Rail transport in Uttar Pradesh
Rail transport in Delhi
Rail transport in Haryana
Rail transport in Chandigarh
Railway services introduced in 2014